Biserramenia is a genus of solenogaster, a kind of shell-less, worm-like mollusk.

Species
 Biserramenia psammobionta Salvini-Plawen, 1967

References

 Salvini-Plawen L. von (1967). Über die Beziehungen zwischen den Merkmalen von Standort, Nahrung und Verdauungstrakt bei Solenogastres. Zeitschrift für Morphologie und Ökologie der Tiere 59: 318-340
 Vaught, K.C.; Tucker Abbott, R.; Boss, K.J. (1989). A classification of the living Mollusca. American Malacologists: Melbourne. ISBN 0-915826-22-4. XII, 195 pp

External links
 Gofas, S.; Le Renard, J.; Bouchet, P. (2001). Mollusca. in: Costello, M.J. et al. (eds), European Register of Marine Species: a check-list of the marine species in Europe and a bibliography of guides to their identification. Patrimoines Naturels. 50: 180-213

Solenogastres